The 110th Bomb Squadron (110 BS) is a unit of the Missouri Air National Guard 131st Bomb Wing located at Whiteman Air Force Base, Knob Noster, Missouri. The 110th is equipped with the Northrop Grumman B-2 Spirit.

The 110 BS is the oldest unit in the Missouri Air National Guard, with over 90 years of service to the state and nation. It is a descendant organization of the World War I 110th Aero Squadron, established on 14 August 1917. It was reformed on 23 June 1923, as the 110th Observation Squadron, and is one of the 29 original National Guard Observation Squadrons of the United States Army National Guard formed before World War II.

The 131st Bomb Wing, of which the 110th Bomb Squadron is a part, is the only Air National Guard Bomb Wing certified to conduct nuclear operations.

History

World War I

Established at Kelly Field, Texas in August 1917 as the 110th Aero Squadron.  Constructed facilities and engaged in supply and related base support activities. Later re-designated as 804th Aero Squadron (1 February 1918), then "Squadron K, Kelly Field"  in July 1918.  Demobilized 1918 shortly after the Armistice with Germany.

Missouri National Guard
Established by the Militia Bureau on 23 June 1923, which authorized the immediate organization of the 110th Observation Squadron, 35th Division Aviation, Missouri National Guard.  First Headquarters was located in a filling station on Manchester Avenue. From there it was moved to a small room over a grocery store on Olive Street Road in St Louis County. Meetings were held at the Airport, then little more than a pasture, there were no airplanes and no uniforms for the enlisted men.  The squadron's original authorized officer strength was 1 major, 5 captains, 11 1st lieutenants and 14 2nd lieutenants for a total of 31.  In its early years, the squadron had only about half of its authorized officer strength.  The squadron's first commanding officer was Major William B. Robertson.

The squadron's first flying equipment was a Curtiss JN-4 "Jenny", which was purchased by the officers of the squadron and used for flight training until early 1924 when three surplus wartime JN-4's were received. The planes were housed in a corrugated sheet metal hangar erected on the field during the National Air Races in 1923 and later turned over to the squadron. Additional aircraft and equipment were received throughout 1924 and by the year's end a well received training program was in effect.  Only eighteen months had elapsed since the unit was formally organized.

During the next few years the JN-4's were replaced by the PT-1, TW-3, O-11, and O-2H aircraft and the unit assumed a mission of observation and reconnaissance. Their chief pilot on the "St. Louis to Chicago" airmail run was a young man named Charles Lindbergh. Lindbergh became a member of the 110th as a 2nd lieutenant on 14 March 1925 and held the rank of captain when he made his historic 1927 Trans-Atlantic solo flight.  Lindbergh remained a member of the squadron until 1929. 

Men, equipment, and unit headquarters consolidated in a new hangar at Lambert Field in 1931. Summer field training conducted in the 1930s allowed 110th members to hone their skills on the K-17 Aerial Camera. The Douglas O-38 aircraft was received in 1933 and replaced in 1938 by the North American O-47A, an all-metal mid-wing observation aircraft.

The units first summer encampments were held in 1924 and 1925 at Camp Clark Nevada, Missouri. Subsequent encampments were at Fort Riley Kansas; Lambert Field St Louis; Eglin Field Florida; Fort Sill, Oklahoma; and St Cloud Minnesota.

World War II
The Guardsmen were ordered into active service on 23 December 1940 as part of the buildup of the Army Air Corps after the Fall of France.  The unit was sent to Little Rock, Arkansas and initially flew antisubmarine patrols over the Gulf of Mexico.  After the Attack on Pearl Harbor, the squadron was sent to California where it flew patrols over the Southern California coast again performing antisubmarine patrols.

In early 1943, it was assigned to Third Air Force and trained as a combat reconnaissance unit, being equipped with a mixture of photo-recon A-20 Havocs and B-25 Mitchells.  Was deployed to Fifth Air Force in the Southwest Pacific in the fall of 1943 and flew reconnaissance missions over New Britain, New Guinea, and the Admiralty Islands from bases in New Guinea and Biak. Reinforced with armed P-40 and P-39 fighters, it also flew combat mission against Japanese installations, airfields, and shipping, while supporting Allied ground forces on New Guinea and Biak. During that time, it flew courier missions, participated in rescue operations, and hauled passengers and cargo. From November 1944, the group flew reconnaissance missions over Luzon, supported ground forces, photographed and bombed airfields in Formosa and China, and attacked enemy shipping in the South China Sea.  A Presidential Unit Citation awarded for the 12/26/44 attack on Japanese Naval Task Force. In all, the unit destroyed 122 aircraft and 11 ships.

At the end of the war, the 110th Tactical Reconnaissance Squadron moved to Japan and was part of the occupation forces.  It demobilized in the fall of 1945 and was inactivated in early 1946.

Missouri Air National Guard
The wartime 110th Tactical Reconnaissance Squadron was re-activated and re-designated as the 110th Fighter Squadron, and was allotted to the Missouri Air National Guard on 24 May 1946. It was organized at Lambert Field, St Louis, and was extended federal recognition on 1 January 1947 by the National Guard Bureau.  The 119th Fighter Squadron was bestowed the history, honors, and colors of the wartime 110th TRS. The squadron was equipped with F-51D Mustang fighters and assigned to the Missouri ANG 131st Fighter Group.   Its mission was the air defense of St Louis and the state of Missouri.

Korean War activation

On 1 March 1951 the 110th was federalized and brought to active-duty due to the Korean War.  It was initially assigned to Strategic Air Command (SAC) and transferred to Bergstrom AFB, Texas and assigned to the Federalized Missouri ANG 131st Fighter-Bomber Group.  The 131st FBG was composed of the 110th FS, the 192d Fighter Squadron (Nevada ANG), the 178th Fighter Squadron (North Dakota ANG), and the 170th Fighter Squadron (Illinois ANG).  At Berstrom, its mission was as a filler replacement for the 27th Fighter-Escort Group which was deployed to Japan as part of SAC's commitment to the Korean War.

The unit was at Bergstrom until November when it was transferred to Tactical Air Command (TAC) and moved to George AFB, California.  At George, the unit was scheduled to be re-equipped with F-84D Thunderjets and was programmed for deployment to Japan, however, the F-84s were instead sent to France and the 131st Fighter-Bomber Wing remained in California and flew its F-51 Mustangs for the remainder of its federal service.   The 110th Fighter-Bomber Squadron was released from active duty and returned to Missouri's control on 1 December 1952.

Tactical Air Command
Shortly after its return to Lambert Field, the 110th was reformed as a light bombardment squadron in January 1953 and was moved under Tactical Air Command.   It received B-26 Invaders that returned from the Korean War and trained primarily in night bombardment missions, which the aircraft specialized in while in Korea.

With the removal of the B-26 from bombing duties in 1957 as neared the end of their service lives, the 110th entered the Jet Age. The 110th received its first jet aircraft in the spring of 1957 when it received F-80 Shooting Stars.  The 110th flew F-80s until June 1957, when it transitioned to the F-84F Thunderstreak fighter-bomber.

On 1 October 1961, as a result of the 1961 Berlin Crisis, the mobilized Missouri Air National Guard 131st Tactical Fighter Wing deployed to Toul-Rosières Air Base, France as the 7131st Tactical Fighter Wing (Provisional).  When activated as the 7131st TFW, it consisted of the 110, 169 and 170 TFS, from Lambert Field, St. Louis MO, Peoria Municipal Airport, Peoria IL, and Capitol Airport, Springfield IL, respectively. The designation 7131st was used as the Wing, composed of three federalized ANG squadrons, only deployed the 110th Tactical Fighter Squadron to France.  The 169th and 170th TFS rotated personnel to Toul-Rosières during their period of activation due to budget restraints, however only one squadron's worth of aircraft and personnel were at Toul at any one time.

While in France, the Guardsmen assumed regular commitments on a training basis with the U.S. 7th Army as well as maintaining a 24-hour alert status.  The 7131st exchanged both air and ground crews with the Royal Danish Air Force's 730th Tactical Fighter Squadron at Skydstrup Air Station, Denmark, during May 1962.  As the Berlin situation subsided, all activated ANG units were ordered to be returned to the United States and released from active duty.  The 7131st TFW was inactivated in place in France on 19 July 1962 and left its aircraft and equipment to USAFE.

After returning to St Louis, the unit was re-equipped with F-100C Super Sabres in late 1962.  It trained with the F-100s for the next 17 years, during which time it upgraded to the F-100D in 1971.  Although the 110th was not activated during the Vietnam War, many of the squadron's pilots were sent to F-100 squadrons in South Vietnam between 1968–1971.  In 1977, Anne Morrow Lindbergh, Charles Lindbergh's widow, gave permission to designate 110th Tactical Fighter Squadron as "Lindbergh's Own."

In 1978, the unit acquired the "home grown" McDonnell Douglas F-4C Phantom II, the aircraft primarily being piloted by Vietnam War veterans. Between June and July 1982, the 110th TFS deployed twelve Phantoms to RAF Leeming in the United Kingdom to participate in Exercise Coronet Cactus. The squadron again upgraded to the more advanced F-4E Phantom II in 1985 and in 1991 was again upgraded to the McDonnell Douglas F-15A/B Eagle air superiority aircraft when the F-4s were retired. The 110th was one of the last Air National Guard units to convert to the F-15.

Air Combat Command
More than 500 members from the 131st Fighter Wing and the tenant units located at Lambert International Airport were called into service to battle the Great Flood of 1993.  In the post-Cold War era, the unit deployed to Incirlik AB, Turkey in support of Operation Northern Watch in 1996, 1997 and 1998.

Members of the 131st returned in October 2000 from duty rotations in Southwest Asia and Europe, while other unit members were still stationed overseas. Eventually, a total of about 430 wing members were scheduled to deploy, with the majority leaving in October 2000 for Prince Sultan AB, Saudi Arabia, in support of Operation Southern Watch. A little more than half of the deployed 131st Fighter Wing members and 12 F-15s made up the AEF-9's 110th Expeditionary Fighter Squadron (EFS). The 110th EFS primarily provides air superiority for Operation Southern Watch. AEF-9 was deployed from September through November 2000.   In 2004, the improved F-15C Eagle arrived, replacing the older aircraft.

On 30 May 2007, a 110th FS F-15D pilot ejected safely from his aircraft (78-0571) just before it crashed during a training mission in rural Knox county, Indiana. The plane went down just before 11 am EDT south of Vincennes, near the Illinois border, as it conducted standard training maneuvers, according to a release from the National Guard. Investigators said the plane was flying at about 20,000 feet prior to the crash. The pilot had been with the 131st Fighter Wing for 12 years and was highly experienced, officials said. The unit had most recently enforced no-fly zones in Iraq. This crash decreased the 131st's aircraft count from 20 to 19.

On 2 November 2007, another F-15C (80-0034) from the 131st crashed in Mark Twain National Forest, in Missouri. No property was damaged and no people on the ground were hurt, however the pilot broke an arm and a shoulder, despite ejecting from the plane. The pilot also was said to be in "shock" when landowners found him. The crash was due to a flaw in a part of the plane's fuselage; this led to all F-15 aircraft being grounded at one point between November and January 2008. Since after the accidents, the 131st's flights have been reduced, also due to the wing slowly moving to flying B-2s. However the 131st and the F-15's were still on active duty.

In its 2005 BRAC recommendations, DoD recommended to realign the 131st Fighter Wing. The 110th's F-15s (15 aircraft) would be distributed to the 57th Fighter Wing, Nellis Air Force Base, Nevada (nine aircraft), and 177th Fighter Wing, Atlantic City International Airport (AGS), New Jersey (six aircraft). After which, the unit was moved to Whiteman Air Force Base and became the first Air National Guard Northrop Grumman B-2 Spirit "stealth bomber" unit.

The F-15's began to leave Lambert on 15 August 2008 and by January 2009, most of the 13 remaining aircraft were in the main hangar being stripped of markings or already had their markings removed. The final two F-15C's departed on 13 June 2009 after a closing ceremony titled "The End of an Era", that was attended by over 2,000 people. Some pilots were taking B-2 training courses while others are changing units, or decided to retire early. The 131st Fighter Wing was the most experienced F-15 Fighter wing in the United States; out of the four pilots that flew over 4,000 F-15 flight hours, three of them were from the unit.

Global Strike Command
The 110th Bomb Squadron, as part of the 131st Bomb Wing, transitioned to Air Force Global Strike Command on 4 October 2008 when the 131st Bomb Wing held a ribbon-cutting ceremony at Whiteman AFB. The ceremony celebrated the first official drill for traditional guardsmen at Whiteman and the grand opening of building 3006, the 131st Bomb Wing's first headquarters there. On 16 June 2009, the last F-15 departed Lambert Field. In March 2011, crew from the 110th BS participated in Operation Odyssey Dawn, which saw airstrikes over Libya against the forces of Muammar Gaddafi.

In August 2013, the 131st Bomb Wing was deemed fully mission-capable, meaning that it fully completed the transition to Whiteman Air Force Base. In March 2020, the squadron deployed to RAF Fairford, UK, alongside the 509th Bomb Wing as part of a Bomber Task Force.

Lineage

 Organized as 110th Aero Squadron** on 14 August 1917
 Re-designated: 110th Aero Squadron (Repair) on 1 September 1917
 Re-designated: 804th Aero Squadron (Repair) on 1 February 1918
 Re-designated: Squadron K, Kelly Field, Texas, on 23 July 1918
 Demobilized on 18 November 1918
 Reconstituted and consolidated (1936) with 110th Observation Squadron which, having been allotted to the Missouri NG, was organized on 23 June 1923
 Ordered to active service on 23 December 1940
 Re-designated: 110th Observation Squadron (Light) on 13 January 1942
 Re-designated: 110th Observation Squadron on 4 July 1942
 Re-designated: 110th Reconnaissance Squadron (Fighter) on 2 April 1943
 Re-designated: 110th Tactical Reconnaissance Squadron on 10 May 1944
 Inactivated on 20 February 1946
 Re-designated: 110th Fighter Squadron and allotted to Missouri ANG on 24 May 1946
 Extended federal recognition on 23 September 1946
 Federalized and placed on active duty, 1 March 1951
 Re-designated: 110th Fighter-Bomber Squadron, 1 July 1951
 Released from active duty and returned to Missouri state control, 1 December 1952
 Re-designated: 110th Bombardment Squadron (Light), 1 December 1952
 Re-designated: 110th Tactical Fighter Squadron, 1 January 1960
 Federalized and placed on active duty, 1 October 1961
 Released from active duty and returned to Missouri state control, 31 August 1962
 Re-designated: 110th Fighter Squadron on 15 March 1992
 Re-designated: 110th Bomb Squadron on 4 October 2008

** This unit is not related to another 110th Aero Squadron (Service) that was activated in May 1918 at Rich Field, Waco, Texas.

Assignments
 Post Headquarters, Kelly Field, 14 August 1917 – 18 November 1918
 Missouri NG (divisional aviation, 35th Division), 23 June 1923
 VII Army Corps, c. December 1940
 II Air Support Command, 1 September 1941
 71st Observation (later Reconnaissance; Tactical Reconnaissance; Reconnaissance) Group, 1 October 1941
 Seventh Air Force, 20 October 1945
 Far East Air Forces (later Pacific Air Command, US Army), c. 3 December 1945 – 20 February 1946
 131st Fighter Group, 23 September 1946
 131st Composite Wing, 31 October 1950
 131st Fighter-Bomber Wing, 1 July 1951
 131st Bomb Wing (Light), 1 December 1952
 131st Fighter-Bomber Wing, 1 January 1953
 131st Tactical Fighter Wing, 1 January 1960
 7131st Tactical Fighter Wing, 1 October 1961
 131st Tactical Fighter Wing, 31 August 1962
 131st Operations Group, 15 March 1992 – Present

Stations

 Kelly Field, Texas, 14 August 1917 – 18 November 1918
 Kinloch Airfield, St Louis, Missouri, 23 June 1923
 Lambert-St. Louis Flying Field, Missouri, July 1931
 Adams Field, Little Rock, Arkansas, 3 January 1941
 Salinas Army Air Base, California. 22 December 1941
 Esler Army Airfield, Louisiana, 28 January 1943
 Laurel Army Airfield, Mississippi, 1 April–20 October 1943
 Archerfield Airport, Brisbane, Queensland, Australia, 5 December 1943
 Wards Airfield (5 Mile Drome), Port Moresby, New Guina, 21 December 1943
 Flight operated from Gusap Airfield, New Guinea after 20 January 1944
 Gusap Airfield, New Guinea, 7 February 1944
 Operated from Tadji Airfield, New Guinea after 25 May 1944
 Tadji Airfield, New Guinea, 5 June 1944
 Mokmer Airfield, Biak, Netherlands East Indies, 11 September 1944

 Dulag Airfield, Leyte, Philippines, 3 November 1944 – 22 January 1945
 Operated primarily from: Tacloban Airfield, Leyte, Philippines, to 24 December 1944
 Operated primarily from: McGuire Field, Mindoro, Philippines, 25 December 1944 – 22 January 1945
 Lingayen Airfield, Luzon, Philippines, 20 January 1945
 Ie Shima Airfield, Ryukyu Islands, 29 July 1945
 Chofu Airfield, Japan, 6 October 1945
 Fort William McKinley, Luzon, Philippines, December 1945-20 February 1946
 Lambert Field (Later Lambert-St. Louis International Airport), St Louis, Missouri, 23 September 1946
 Designated: Lambert Field Air National Guard Base, Missouri, 1991–2009
 Operated from: Bergstrom AFB, Texas, 1 March 1951 – July 1951
 Operated from: George AFB, California, July 1951-1 December 1952
 Operated from: Toul-Rosieres AB, France, 1 October 1961
 Whiteman AFB, Missouri, 4 October 2008 – Present

Aircraft

 Curtiss JN-4, 1923–1927
 Douglas O-2C, 1926–1933
 Consolidated PT-1, 1927–1933
 Curtis O-11, 1928–1933
 Douglas O-2H, 1929–1933
 Consolidated O-17, 1930
 Douglas O-38, 1933–1941
 North American O-47, c. 1938–1942
 Bell P-39 Airacobra, 1942–1944
 P-40 Warhawk, 1942–1945
 F-10 Mitchell, 1943
 F-3A Havoc, 1942–1943

 F-6 Mustang, 1945
 F-51D Mustang, 1946–1952
 B-26 Invader, 1953–1957
 F-80 Shooting Star, 1957
 F-84F Thunderstreak, 1957–1962
 F-100C/F Super Sabre, 1962–1971
 F-100D/F Super Sabre, 1971–1979
 F-4C Phantom II, 1979–1985
 F-4E Phantom II, 1985–1991
 F-15A/B Eagle, 1991–2004
 F-15C/D Eagle, 2004–2009
 B-2 Spirit, 2009–present

See also 

 List of American aero squadrons
 List of observation squadrons of the United States Army National Guard

References 

 
 110th Bomb Squadron lineage and history
 110th Bomb Squadron@globalsecurity.org
 131st Bomb Wing website

External links

Squadrons of the United States Air National Guard
Military units and formations in Missouri
Bombardment squadrons of the United States Air Force